Lestoidea is a genus of damselflies in the family Lestoideidae,
commonly known as bluestreaks.
Its species are endemic to north-east Queensland, Australia, where they inhabit rainforest streams.

Species of Lestoidea are medium-sized to large damselflies, dark brown to black in colour, with a dull orange area on the side of the thorax and greenish-yellow markings elsewhere.

Species
The genus Lestoidea has four species:

Lestoidea barbarae  - large bluestreak
Lestoidea brevicauda - short-tipped bluestreak
Lestoidea conjuncta - common bluestreak
Lestoidea lewisiana  - Mount Lewis bluestreak

See also
 List of Odonata species of Australia

References 

Lestoideidae
Zygoptera genera
Odonata of Australia
Endemic fauna of Australia
Taxa named by Robert John Tillyard
Insects described in 1913
Damselflies